Khandevane  or Khandevaneh  ( (portmanteau of laughter and watermelon) is an Iranian telecast directed by Rambod Javan. It first aired on 11 June 2014 on Nasim channel. The program is focused on showing that there should not be any reason not to laugh using various acts such as stand-up comedy. It aired on cable network IRIB Nasim on Wednesdays to Fridays at 23:00 (IST).
For its first two seasons, the program consisted of several parts like: Stand-up comedy, Live music, and Interviews. Other programs include: Report of the people, Competition in the studio, Sms Competition for featured viewers, and Lottery.
A new item added to the show from its third season is Labahang (Lip sync). It is proclaimed by the program that it is adapted from Lip Sync Battle.

Several artists made original songs for the show . Gamno,Habib Badiri,Bomrani, Maziar Sarmeh, Mohsen Chavoshi, Reza Yazdani, and many others.

The program is hosted by Rambod Javan and Nima Shabannejad. There is also a doll, Jenab Khan participating in the show. It has spawned a spin-off, which has mainly the same elements but omitted the audience, called Ghaach (means Slice). Its first season was begun as a tie-in to 2018 World Cup, and the second season was launched alongside the Season 6 of Khandevane.

Hosts
 Rambod Javan
 Jenab Khan
 Nima Shabannejad

Elements 

 Rambod Javan (Designer, Director and Presenter)
 Mohammad-Fuad Safarianpour (Art Director)
 Ali Ahmadi (Producer)
 Sajjad Afsharian (Author)
 Bahram Azimi (Making Titles and Animation)
 Habib Badiri and Hooman "Gamno" Shahi (Singer and Composer)
 Mahmoud Karimi (Reporter)
 Behrouz Baghai (Reporter Provinces - Season 2)
 Abolfazl Sabbagh (Reporter London - Season 2)
 Mehdi Shah-Hosseini (Stage Manager)
 Bozorgmehr Hosseinpour (Thinker)

Actors
 Mohammad Bahrani (voice Jenab Khan)
 Nima Shaban Nejad
 Danial Ghafar Zadeh
 Arzhang Amirfazli

Episodes 
Season 1: 11 June 2014 - 25 October 2014 (114 episodes)
Season 2: 18 April 2015 - 13 October 2015 (157 episodes)
Season 3: 15 March 2016 - 1 October 2016 (137 episodes)
Season 4: 20 December 2016 - 19 September 2017 (187 episodes)
Season 5: 16 May 2018 - 7 September 2018 (42 episodes)
Season 6: 21 November 2018 - 5 April 2019 (49 episodes + 16 Nowruz specials)
Season 7: 10 March 2021 - TBA

Awards and nominations

References

External links
 

2010s Iranian television series
2014 Iranian television series debuts
Iranian television shows
Islamic Republic of Iran Broadcasting original programming
Television productions suspended due to the COVID-19 pandemic